Bradley Robert Sandeman (born 24 February 1970) is an English former footballer who made 249 league and cup appearances in a nine-year career in the Football League.

A versatile passer of the ball, he began his career at Northampton Town in 1988. He was sold on to Maidstone United for £10,000 in February 1991, before he was allowed to join Port Vale on a free transfer in July 1992. He helped the club to win promotion out of the Second Division in 1993–94, before he was given a free transfer to Rotherham United in May 1996. He moved on to Hereford United in March 1997, and later had spells with non-league clubs Northwich Victoria, Kettering Town, Leek Town, Hyde United, Kidsgrove Athletic, Witton Albion and Dover Athletic.

Playing career

Northampton Town
Sandeman started his career at Northampton Town under the management of Graham Carr in 1986. The "Cobblers" avoided relegation out of the Third Division in 1988–89 only due to their superior goal difference to Southend United. They failed to avoid the drop into the Fourth Division in 1989–90, which led to Carr being sacked and replaced by Theo Foley. Sandeman left the County Ground in February 1991, having been sold on to league rivals Maidstone United for a £10,000 fee; the move reunited him with former boss Graham Carr. The "Stones" finished in the lower half of the table in both 1990–91 and 1991–92. He left the club just months before its collapse.

Port Vale
He joined Port Vale in July 1992, with manager John Rudge looking to add strength in depth to help with the push for promotion out of the Second Division. He was a regular first team player in 1992–93 until he picked up a thigh injury in February, which required an operation. This caused him to miss both the 1993 League Trophy Final and the 1993 Second Division play-off Final at Wembley. He was used sparingly following his recovery, leaving him to play a limited role in the 1993–94 promotion campaign until he re-gained his first team spot in May 1994.  He was a first team regular in the First Division in 1994–95, before he fell out of favour once again in July 1995. The 1995–96 season was his last at Vale Park, and was not picked to play in the final of the Anglo-Italian Cup. He was given a free transfer to Rotherham United in May 1996.

Rotherham United
Originally signed to play at right-back, he soon was pushed further forward into midfield. The "Millers" suffered relegation out of the Second Division in 1996–97 under Danny Bergara, though Sandeman had left Millmoor for Hereford United in March 1997.

Later career
He made just seven appearances for the "Bulls", and left the club in the summer after the Edgar Street club were relegated into the Conference under Graham Turner. He spent the first half of the 1997–98 season with Northwich Victoria, before joining Conference rivals Kettering Town in December 1997, who were managed by former teammate Steve Berry. He later combined his duties as a postal worker with playing semi-professional football. He signed with Leek Town in July 2000 and scored seven goals in 55 appearances in the 2000–01 season as the "Blues" were relegated out of the Northern Premier League Premier Division; he was voted as the club's Player of the Season. He then moved on to Hyde United, but did not make an appearance for the "Tigers". He served Witton Albion as caretaker-manager in August 2003, winning all four matches. He also played 37 games in the 2002–03 season and 26 games in the 2003–04 season. He joined Kidsgrove Athletic in July 2004. He signed with Dover Athletic in February 2005 after being recruited by Clive Walker.

Coaching career
In 2008, he joined Kent League club Tunbridge Wells, becoming assistant manager at the club the following year. He helped the "Wells" to reach the 2013 FA Vase Final. He was appointed as a coach at Lordswood in July 2015. He followed manager James Collins to help coach Cray Valley Paper Mills in 2016.

Style of play
Sandeman was a versatile player and an accomplished and effective passer of the ball and a great and committed tackler.

Career statistics

Managerial statistics

Honours
Individual
Leek Town F.C. Player of the Season: 2000–01

Port Vale
Football League Second Division second-place promotion: 1993–94

References

1970 births
Living people
Footballers from Northampton
English footballers
Association football defenders
Association football midfielders
Northampton Town F.C. players
Maidstone United F.C. (1897) players
Port Vale F.C. players
Rotherham United F.C. players
Hereford United F.C. players
Northwich Victoria F.C. players
Kettering Town F.C. players
Leek Town F.C. players
Hyde United F.C. players
Kidsgrove Athletic F.C. players
Witton Albion F.C. players
Dover Athletic F.C. players
Tunbridge Wells F.C. players
English Football League players
National League (English football) players
Southern Football League players
Northern Premier League players
Isthmian League players
English football managers
Witton Albion F.C. managers
Northern Premier League managers
Association football coaches